Phillip Ray Shepard (born November 10, 1954) is a Republican member of the North Carolina General Assembly. He represents the 15th district.

Electoral history

2020

2018

2016

2014

2012

2010

Committee assignments

2021-2022 session
Appropriations (Vice Chair)
Appropriations - Transportation (Chair)
Commerce 
Education - K-12 
Health 
Homeland Security, Military, and Veterans Affairs 
Transportation (Chair)

2019-2020 session
Appropriations (Vice Chair)
Appropriations - Transportation (Chair)
Commerce 
Health 
Homeland Security, Military, and Veterans Affairs 
Transportation (Chair)

2017-2018 session
Appropriations (Vice Chair)
Appropriations - Transportation (Chair)
Commerce and Job Development
Education - K-12
Health
Homeland Security, Military, and Veterans Affairs
Transportation (Chair)

2015-2016 session
Appropriations (Vice Chair)
Appropriations - Transportation (Chair)
Commerce and Job Development
Homeland Security, Military, and Veterans Affairs
Transportation (Chair)
Education - Community Colleges
Insurance

2013-2014 session
Appropriations (Vice Chair)
Commerce and Job Development (Vice Chair)
Transportation (Vice Chair)
Education
Insurance
Regulatory Reform

2011-2012 session
Appropriations
Commerce and Job Development (Vice Chair)
Education
Insurance
Banking

References

External links

1954 births
Living people
Republican Party members of the North Carolina House of Representatives
21st-century American politicians
Candidates in the 2019 United States elections